Stop loss may refer to:

 Stop-loss insurance, an insurance policy that goes into effect after a set amount is paid in claims
 Stop-loss order, stock or commodity market order to close a position if/when losses reach a threshold
 Stop-loss policy, US military requirement for soldiers to remain in service beyond their normal discharge date
 Stop-loss variant, a genetic variant that causes loss of a stop codon

In media

 Stop-Loss (film), a 2008 film about soldiers subject to the stop-loss policy
 "Stop-Loss" (Dollhouse), an episode of the TV series Dollhouse

See also 
Escalation of commitment

pl:Stop loss